Puerto Rico Daily Sun is the island's only daily English-language newspaper. The paper is based in San Juan, Puerto Rico. It is published seven days a week by Cooperativa Prensa Unida. It succeeded the "San Juan Star," which ended publication on August 29, 2008 after an almost 49-year run. Reporters had gone several weeks without being paid. The newspaper closed by the end of 2011.

References

External links
  

Publications established in 2008
Newspapers published in Puerto Rico
Mass media in San Juan, Puerto Rico
English-language newspapers published in North America